Arthur Benjamin Appleby (born 13 June 1876) was a professional footballer who spent the vast majority of his career at Bristol Rovers. He was signed by Rovers manager Alfred Homer in 1903 having played just a single game of League football, for West Bromwich Albion against Glossop North End in the Football League Second Division, but he immediately established himself as a regular in the Rovers' first team. He was part of the team that won the Southern League championship in 1905.

Appleby retired from professional football in 1908, going on to play non-League football in Gloucester.

Sources

1876 births
1961 deaths
Sportspeople from Burton upon Trent
English footballers
Association football midfielders
English Football League players
West Bromwich Albion F.C. players
Bristol Rovers F.C. players